Negar Mottahedeh is a cultural critic and film theorist specializing in interdisciplinary and feminist contributions to the fields of Middle Eastern Studies and Film Studies.

Early life 
She is known for her work on Iranian Cinema, but has also published on the history of reform and revolution, on `Abdu'l-Baha's vision of human solidarity and peace in the 20th Century, on Bábism, Qajar history, performance traditions in Iran, the history of technology, visual theory, Majid Tavakoli and the Men in Scarves Movement (also known as the "I am Majid" campaign), and the role of social media in the 2009–2010 Iranian election protests. With the publication of #iranelection: Hashtag Solidarity and the Transformation of online life in 2015, she expanded her focus to the cultures and practices of the web, writing on the political efficacy of selfies, memes and gifs in The Hill (2017), and pieces on internet security and Iranian hacker culture on WIRED's platform Backchannel (2017).  She also wrote articles for Observer, covering the effects of President Trump's travel ban, and the persecution of the Jews and the Baháʼí (2017).

She received her Ph.D. in 1998 from the University of Minnesota. She has taught at the Ohio Wesleyan University in Delaware, Ohio, and in 2002 began teaching at Duke University, where she is associate professor in the Program in Literature and in the Women's Studies Program. Mottahedeh curated the "Reel Evil: Films from the Axis of Evil" film festival with Miriam Cooke in 2003 and created Brainquake with Golbarg Bashi in response to Boobquake on April 26, 2010.

Publications

Books 
 
 
 ‘Abdu’l-Bahá's Journey West: The Course of Human Solidarity. Editor. Palgrave Macmillan, 2013. 
 #iranelection: Hashtag Solidarity and the Transformation of Online Life. Stanford University Press, 2015. Winner of Abu Aardvark 2015 Middle East Book Award.
 
 After Oil, 2016 (Contributing author)

Articles 
 "Iranian Cinema in the Twentieth Century: A Sense History." Iranian Studies 42:4 (September 2009).
 
 
 “Collection and Recollection: on studying the early history of the motion pictures in Iran." Early Popular Visual Culture  (June, 2008).
 
 "Ruptured Spaces, Effective Histories: Tahirih in History: Perspective on Qurrat al-‘Ayn from East and West. Studies in the Babi and Baháʼí Religions, vol. 16 (Fall, 2004), online at Baháʼí Library Online.
 "Off the Grid: Reading Iranian Memoirs in Our Time of Total War." Middle East Research and Information Project (September 2004), online at merip.org.
 "Life is Color! Towards a transnational feminist analysis of Mohsen Makhmalbaf's Gabbeh."  Special issue on film, in Feminism Signs  (2004).
 "Where are Kiarostami's Women?" On the Foreignness of Film  (2004).
 
 "Bahram Bayza`i's Maybe Some Other Time: The un-Present-able Iran." Camera Obscura: Feminism, Culture and Media Studies, 43 (2000), pp. 163–191.
 
 "Images of Women: [08] Middle East." In Angharad N. Valdivia, ed., The Routledge International Encyclopedia of Women's Studies (2000).
 "Bahram Bayza`i: Filmography."  in Life and Art: the New Iranian Cinema  (1999), pp 74–82. Translated into Persian as Zindihgi va honar: sinama-yi novin-i Iran, trans. by Parvanih Faridi and Omid Rawhani (Tehran, 1379), pp. 101–110,
 "The Mutilated Body of the Modern Nation." Comparative Studies of South Asia, Africa and the Middle East 18:2 (1998), pp. 38–50, online at Baháʼí Library Online.
 
 "Scheduled For Judgment Day: The Ta’ziyeh Performance in Qajar Persia and Walter Benjamin’s Dramatic Vision of History." Theatre InSight 8:1 (Spring, 1997), pp. 12–20.
 "Ruptured Spaces and Effective Histories: The Unveiling of the Babi Poetess Qurrat al-’Ayn-Tahirih in the Gardens of Badasht." First published in UCLA Historical Journal 17 (1997): 59-81, then in H-Bahai's Occasional Papers in Shaykhi, Babi and Baha'i Studies, 2:2 (February, 1998) — a refereed on-line journal — at h-net.org.
 
 
 
 Planetarity Cambridge University Press, 2021. doi:10.1017/9781108979658.020

Journalism 

 "Using 'The Selfie' To Protest," NPR's The State of Things (December 21, 2016)
 "Iranian Professor: Trump Travel Ban Ensnares Academics Who Are Uplifting America," Observer (February 5, 2017)
 "As Vandals Trash a Jewish Cemetery, an Iranian Recalls the Persecution of the Baháʼí," Observer (February 22, 2017)
 "Memes, gifs and political power — as lines blur between the online and offline worlds," The Hill (July 10, 2017)
 "How My Instagram Hacker Changed My Life," Wired Backchannel (August 16, 2017)
 "Befriending the person who hacked your Instagram," NPR's Marketplace Tech, host Molly Wood (August 24, 2017)

Other 
 Co-curated with Hamid Dabashi and La Frances Hui the Asia Society's tribute to the silenced Iranian director Jafar Panahi (February 25-March 11, 2011).
 "Where the Future Nests: 19th Century Babi and Bahai Photography." Lecture hosted by the Ezri Center for Iran & Persian Gulf Studies at the University of Haifa (April 23, 2009); revised for the "Intellectual Othering and the Bahai Question in Iran" in Toronto (July 2, 2011). Archived at Baháʼí Library Online.
 "Negative Refractions: Recent feminist writing on the Middle East." Women's Studies Quarterly (Winter 2006).
 Review of "Abbas Kiarostami" by Mehrnaz Saeed-Vafa and Jonathan Rosenbaum". Historical Journal of Film, Radio and Television 29:3 (August 2009).
 Review of "The Making of a Rebel Filmmaker: Makhmalbaf at Large by Hamid Dabashi". (Winter 2009).
 Review of Ed. Richard Tapper, "The New Iranian Cinema: Politics, Representation, and Identity". Iranian Studies 38:2 (June 2005), pp. 341–344.
 Review of "Iranian Islam: The Concept of the Individual by Nader Ahmadi and Fereshteh Ahmadi". Iranian Studies 33:1-2 (2005).
 Review of Hamid Naficy, "An Accented Cinema: Exilic and Diasporic Filmmaking". Iranian Studies 36:3 (2004).

Awards 

 Persian Heritage Foundation "Latifeh Yarshater Award" for Representing the Unpresentable (2008)
 Persian Heritage Foundation Book Award for Displaced Allegories (2008)
 Washington Post's Abu Aardvark Middle East Book Award (2015) for #iranelection: Hashtag Solidarity and the Transformation of Online Life.

References

External links 
 Negar Mottahedeh's author page on Amazon
 Negar Mottahedeh's technology and the human experience blog
 Negar Mottahedeh's NYC blog
 Mottahedeh's page at Duke Program in Literature
 Mottahedeh's page at Duke Women's Studies
 Whisper Tapes, DW
 Mottahedeh's page at Duke Islamic Studies Center
 A list of author's books
 Duke Live Online Office Hours with Negar Mottahedeh Ustream
 Mideast Youth Podcast interview with Negar Mottahedeh
 
 #iranelection: An Interview with Negar Mottahedeh on Protest, Play, and the 2009 Green Movement
 Duke University Press interviews Negar Mottahedeh on the 30th Anniversary of the Islamic Republic of Iran
 Second Cinema interviews Negar Mottahedeh on Post-Revolutionary Iranian Cinema
 Tehran Bureau interviews Negar Mottahedeh

Iranian film critics
Iranian writers
Iranian expatriate academics
Iranian activists
University of Minnesota alumni
Duke University faculty
Living people
Year of birth missing (living people)